Carl Simpson (born April 18, 1970) is a former American professional football player.

Biography
Simpson was born in Vidalia, Georgia. He graduated from Appling County High School in Baxley Georgia. Simpson attended Florida State University, and was a student and a letterman in football. In football, he was a two-year starter as a defensive lineman, and as a senior, he was a first-team All-Atlantic Coast Conference selection.

Professional career
He was drafted by the Chicago Bears in the 2nd round (35th overall) of the 1993 NFL Draft. In 5 seasons with the Bears and 1 season with the Arizona Cardinals, he recorded 7.5 sacks.

References

External links 
 
 databaseFootball.com: Carl Simpson
 Pro-Football-Reference.com: Carl Simpson

1970 births
Living people
American football defensive ends
American football defensive tackles
Chicago Bears players
Arizona Cardinals players
Florida State Seminoles football players
Players of American football from Georgia (U.S. state)
People from Vidalia, Georgia
Las Vegas Outlaws (XFL) players